Hednota grammellus is a moth in the family Crambidae. It was described by Zeller in 1863. It is found in Australia, where it has been recorded from New South Wales and Victoria.

The forewings are white with a pattern of brown lines.

References

Crambinae
Moths described in 1863